Jivantasvami images represent the Jain Tirthankara Mahavira (and in some cases other Tirthankaras) as a prince, with a crown and ornaments. The Jina is represented as standing in the kayotsarga pose. Jivantasvami images have been used only in the Shvetambara Jain tradition, they are unknown in the Digambara tradition.

Description 
The earliest reference to the Jivantasvami images is found in the later commentaries on the Shvetambara Jain Agamas (c.mid 6th century AD onwards), Vasudevahindi of Samghadasagani(c. mid 6th century CE) the Avashyakachurni (c. 625 CE) the Avashyakavritti of Haribhadra Suri(c. 750 CE) and the Trishashtishalakapurushacharita of Hemachandra (c. 1169-72 CE). These mention the existence of Jivantasvami images at Ujjain, Dashapura (Mandsaur), Vidisha, Vitabhayapattana, Puri and Koshala. Mahavira Jain temple, Osian houses three  Jivantasvami images inside temple. Two of these idols are identical, with one having inscription dated 1044 C.E. that identifies the idol to be of Rishabhanatha.

According to Hemachandra, the  original image was made by god Vidyunmali, carved in sandalwood, during the time Lord Mahavira was still a prince. According to the legend of the queen of Udayana of Vitabhaya worshipped this image. This image was eventually installed at Vidisha, but was eventually lost.

The best known  images of Jivantasvami were found in the Akota Hoard, and are widely mentioned examples of the early western Indian school of art. One of them is specifically inscribed as Jivantsvami installed by Nagisvari, which represents early phase of the Gupta style. The images were dug out sometime before June 1951. A University of Baroda professor brought five of them to archaeologist U.P. Shah for examination. U.P. Shat eventually  purchased most of the images from local individuals and presented them to M.S. University, which are now in the Baroda Museum. Two Mahavira Jivantasvami idols at Baroda Museum are dateable to 6th century. 

Other tirthankaras including Rishabhnath (1st Jina), Sumatinatha (5th Jina), Chandraprabha (8th Jina), Shitalanatha (10th Jina), Shantinath (16th Jina), Munisuvrata (20th Jina) and Parshvanatha (23rd Jina), were also sometimes represented in the form of Jivantasvami.

Museums

The two famous Jivantasvami images along with the rest of the Akota Hoard bronzes are in the Baroda Museum & Picture Gallery.

See also

 Jainism
 Tirthankara
 Jain art
 Jain Sculpture
 Indian art
 Akota Hoard

References

Citation

Source

External links

   The Collector King - Siyajirao Gaekwad III of Baroda, Akota Bronz image
 Iconography of Early Jainism (Part 3)- Fig. 18. (right) Jivantasvamin, metal image of the Svetambaras, Akota hoard.

Treasure troves of India
Jain art
Indian iconography